There Will Be No Stay is 2015 documentary by Patty Ann Dillon that discusses the death penalty from the point of view of the executioners. It was released in the Cinequest Film Festival on March 1, 2015. It is described as "A journey of compassion and consequence through a process shrouded in secrecy. Executioners' lives intersect on a path to discovering freedom from their own personal prisons."

Production
There Will Be No Stay was originally titled "To Kill The Killer." It was the first episode in a 13-part documentary series that Patty Dillon wrote called Dichotomy of Death originally intended for television. Dillion then changed her mind and decided to make a documentary. The film was written, directed, and produced by Patty Ann Dillon. It was filmed on a small estimated budget of 200,000 from October 15, 2012 - April 5, 2013 with ex-executioners in Sioux Falls, South Dakota, Wilmington, North Carolina, Omaha, Nebraska, and Texas.

The film had its world premiere at the 2015 Big Sky Documentary Film Festival, followed by Cinequest, and the Omaha Film Festival. The film has been nominated for five awards including three best documentary feature awards, and two audience choice awards.

Release nationwide 

The movie was released nationwide via distributor FilmBuff beginning January 19, 2016

References

2015 documentary films